Brébisson or Brebisson is a surname. Notable people with the surname include:

 Cyrille de Brébisson, French programmer
 Louis Alphonse de Brébisson (1798–1888), French botanist and photographer